Frank Harold Crossley (3 May 1874 – 11 August 1943) was an Australian comedian.

History
Crossley was born at Kew, Victoria, the youngest of four children of Henry Crossley and Elizabeth Jane Crossley (née Barnes).

He appeared in companies led by George Rignold J. C. Williamson, William Anderson, George Marlow, and Bland Holt, best remembered for his role as "Karl Von Pumpernick", the polite lunatic, in an early Melbourne production of The Belle of New York and the burlesque Fun on the Bristol, which starred John F. Sheridan.

He enrolled with the First AIF in July 1916 and was posted to the 18th Reinforcements of the 23rd Battalion.
He served overseas before being attached to the 1st Australian Concert Party, called The Anzac Coves, which was formed by General Birdwood, and became famous in England and Scotland.

Crossley died in a Melbourne hospital and his remains were interred at the Coburg Cemetery.

Family
Crossley married singer and pianist Lilian Kathleen "Lily" Lloyd "Miss Iza Millet" (  – 15 May 1933) in 1899. They had two daughters:
Iza Crossley (21 September 1899 – 1992) married Gordon Ireland. She was a singer and excellent swimmer She appeared (credited as "Isa Crossley") in the movies The Mystery of a Hansom Cab, and Diggers in Blighty, and perhaps The Scottish Covenanters of 1909.
Moya Summerson Crossley (9 September 1901 – ) married Leslie Thomas Lonergan. She was a violinist and composer of several songs: "My Mother's Eyes", "My Home Town" and "A-U-double-S-I-E".
They had a home at 20 Service Crescent, South Melbourne.

He was a cousin of Ada Crossley.

References 

1874 births
1943 deaths
19th-century Australian male actors
20th-century Australian male actors
Australian male comedians
Male actors from Melbourne
Comedians from Melbourne
People from Kew, Victoria
People from South Melbourne
Australian military personnel of World War I
Military personnel from Melbourne
20th-century Australian comedians
Australian people of English descent